The 2001–02 Slovak First Football League (known as the Mars superliga for sponsorship reasons) was the ninth season of first-tier football league in Slovakia, since its establishment in 1993. This season started on 14 July 2001 and ended on 8 June 2002. AŠK Inter Slovnaft Bratislava are the defending champions.

Teams
A total of 10 teams was contested in the league, including 9 sides from the 2000–01 season and one promoted from the 2. Liga.

Relegation for FC Spartak Trnava to the 2001–02 2. Liga was confirmed on 8 June 2001. The one relegated team were replaced by ZTS Dubnica nad Váhom.

Stadiums and locations

League table

Results

First half of season

Second half of season

Season statistics

Top scorers

See also
2001–02 Slovak Cup
2001–02 2. Liga (Slovakia)

References

External links
RSSSF.org (Tables and statistics)

Slovak Super Liga seasons
Slovak
1